Holler Back is the fifth studio album by American country music group The Lost Trailers. It was released on August 26, 2008 as their second album for BNA Records. The album's title track was released in March 2008, becoming their first Top 10 hit that year with a peak at number 9. Following it was "How 'bout You Don't", a Top 20 hit. "All This Love" was originally chosen as the third single for release in June 2009 but after "Country Folks (Livin' Loud)" charted as an album cut, it was released as the album's next single.

Content
Four songs from the group's 2006 album The Lost Trailers are included on this album: "Hey Baby", "All This Love", "Summer of Love" and "Gravy." The band produced most of the album along with Blake Chancey; Brett Beavers produced the title track, as well as "How 'bout You Don't" and "Things You Don’t Grow Out Of."

"Holler Back"

The album's title track also served as its lead-off single. Written by The Lost Trailers' lead singer Stokes Nielson and Tim James, this song became the band's first Top 40 country single in early 2008, reaching a peak of number 9 late in the year.

"How 'bout You Don't"

"How 'bout You Don't" was the album's second single, with a late 2008 release. Also co-written by Nielson, it reached a peak of number 17 on the country charts in June 2009.

"Country Folks Livin' Loud"
"Country Folks Livin' Loud" was released as the third single in July 2009 after charting as an album cut in June and replacing "All This Love" which was originally slated to be the third single. Vercher also criticized this song and "Holler Back" for their "inane mischaracterizations" of rural life.

Critical reception

Brady Vercher of Engine 145 gave the album one star out of five, calling it "a ten-song amalgamation of uninspired lyrics, crass commercialism, recycled songs, and exaggerated stereotypes that fail to offer anything of substance." Country Standard Time's Robert Loy gave a generally positive review, praising the band's vocal harmonies and the "thematic consistency" throughout the songs, but thought that the lyrics to "Gravy" were "uncomfortable."

Track listing

Personnel

The Lost Trailers
Ryder Lee- acoustic guitar, keyboards, background vocals
Manny Medina- bass guitar, electric guitar, background vocals
Andrew Nielson- bass guitar, harmonica, keyboards, background vocals
Stokes Nielson- electric guitar, lead vocals
Jeff Potter- drums, percussion, background vocals

Additional musicians
Steve Brewster- drums
Pat Buchanan- electric guitar
Jimmy Carter- bass guitar
Joe Chemay- bass guitar
Lisa Cochran- background vocals
Perry Coleman- background vocals
J.T. Corenflos- electric guitar
Steve Ebe- drums
Mel Eubanks- banjo
Thom Flora- background vocals
Larry Franklin- fiddle
Vicki Hampton- background vocals
Tony Harrell- keyboards, organ, piano, Wurlitzer
Troy Lancaster- electric guitar
Tim Lauer- organ, piano
Gary Morse- steel guitar, dobro
Billy Panda- acoustic guitar
Tony Paoletta- steel guitar
Jason Roller- fiddle, acoustic guitar, mandolin
Ilya Toshinsky- banjo, bouzouki, acoustic guitar

Chart performance

Album

Singles

References

2008 albums
The Lost Trailers albums
BNA Records albums
Albums produced by Blake Chancey
Albums produced by Brett Beavers